Ultimate Hero is a 2016 Chinese-American action adventure crime film directed by Cui Lei and Dragon Chen. It was released in China by Beijing Huanying Shidai Media on August 19, 2016.

Plot
Ultimate Hero follows a man named Han Feng as he attempts to stop a gang of arms smugglers in Africa, from getting their hands on a very rare new energy ore stone.

Cast
Dragon Chen
Alexandre Bailly
Luc Bendza
Zeddy Benson
Gian Derek
Warwica Gilles
Doug Babaru
Israel
Liu Yongqi
Yu Zhenhuan

Reception
The film has grossed  at the Chinese box office.

References

Chinese action adventure films
Chinese crime films
American crime films
American action adventure films
2010s action adventure films
2010s Mandarin-language films
2010s English-language films
2010s American films